Women Are No Angels is a 1943 German comedy film directed by Willi Forst and starring Marte Harell, Axel von Ambesser and Margot Hielscher. The film was made by Wien-Film in German-occupied Austria.

Cast
 Marte Harell as Helga
 Axel von Ambesser as Richard Anden
 Margot Hielscher as Lola
 Curd Jürgens as Bandini
 Richard Romanowsky as Alfred Bolt
 Hedwig Bleibtreu as Frau Orla
 Alfred Neugebauer as Charles
 Petra Trautmann as Kitty
 Gretl Heinz as Bianca
 Angelo Ferrari
 Camilla Gerzhofer

References

Bibliography 
 Hake, Sabine. Popular Cinema of the Third Reich. University of Texas Press, 2001.

External links 
 

1943 films
1943 comedy films
German comedy films
Films of Nazi Germany
1940s German-language films
Films directed by Willi Forst
German black-and-white films
Films set on ships
Films about film directors and producers
1940s German films